William Boggs III (born July 11, 1941) is an American television host and journalist.

Biography

Boggs was born in Philadelphia and graduated from the University of Pennsylvania with a BA. He earned a master's degree from the university's Annenberg School for Communication. He was a celebrity correspondent for the syndicated My Generation television show airing on PBS, featuring interviews inspired by his 2007 HarperCollins book, Got What it Takes?: Successful People Reveal How They Made It to the Top. The book includes interviews with Renée Zellweger, Donald Trump, Sir Richard Branson, Clive Davis, Joe Torre, and others. Based on material in his book, Boggs serves as a motivational speaker for Vistage International, world's largest CEO organization.

He published a novel, At First Sight, with Grosset and Dunlap publishers. That novel and his one-man show about his TV career, Talk Show Confidential, were optioned by Zellweger for a screenplay inspired by his life.

Boggs began his show business career in comedy, when he became the personal manager for a new comedy team named Tom Patchett and Jay Tarses, who were coworkers with Boggs at the Armstrong Cork Company in Lancaster. The three men left Armstrong for show business. While helping to launch their careers Boggs also worked as a substitute teacher in the Philadelphia public school system and later as Assistant Dean of Men, at his alma mater, UPenn. After working with them for three years. Boggs took his first on-camera job in KYW-TV in Philadelphia and stopped managing the team, who went on to write for Bob Newhart, Mary Tyler Moore, and others.

In 1972, Boggs left KYW for then-ABC affiliate WGHP-TV in High Point, North Carolina, where he hosted and produced his first talk show, Southern Exposure. A former news anchorman for WNBC in New York City, he hosted the syndicated All Star Anything Goes (1977–78).

Boggs was a long-time personality on WNEW-TV (now WNYW) from 1975-86. He succeeded Lee Leonard as host of Midday Live and later did likewise on Saturday Morning Live, replacing Gene Rayburn.

He created the first national restaurant review show, TV Diners, for the Food Network, and spent many years hosting the network's first non-cooking/celebrity interview show, Bill Boggs' Corner Table. He co-executive produced and hosted TV's first syndicated stand-up comedy series, Comedy Tonight (1985–86). He hosted Championship Boxing Report Update for Showtime, and Historic Traveler and Freeze Frame (an adventure photographer show) for the Travel Channel.

Boggs was executive producer of The Morton Downey Jr. Show and a founding executive producer of TruTV.

Boggs appeared in several film and television dramas including Oz and Miami Vice. He appeared as himself in the movie Eyes of Laura Mars.

He debuted a solo stage show called Talk Show Confidential in 2003. The show included stories and rare video clips from his years as a television talk show host. He formed Boggs/Baker Productions Inc. with Richard Baker. The company produced several music shows including artists as varied as Lou Reed (A Night with Lou Reed), Bobby Short (Bobby Short & Friends at the Cafe Carlyle), Ian Hunter, Mink DeVille, and a documentary on The Stuttgart Ballet (The Miracle Lives) as well as a syndicated series, Comedy Tonight.

Boggs is an officer of the Friars Club of New York and a member of the board of directors of the American Popular Song Society, and has been inducted into the Northeast Philadelphia Hall of Fame.

In addition to his work on television, he is a leadership coach and motivational speaker for Vistage International. He writes a restaurant column for the website thedailymeal.com.

Boggs has performed six stage presentations drawn from his career: Talk Show Confidential, Memories of Sinatra, Fun at the Food Network, A Ratpack Revival, Voices of Our Time, and Confessions of a Talk Show Host.

Personal life
Boggs has been married four times. His first marriage was to a college classmate, and was annulled. His second marriage was to Leslie Bennetts, a journalist and columnist for Vanity Fair. He was married to Canadian actress Linda Thorson for 19 years, and they have a son, Trevor. His fourth marriage, to publishing executive Carol Edmunds Campbell, ended in divorce in 2010.
Boggs now lives with longtime girlfriend Jane Rothchild.

Filmography

References

External links
 
 
 
 
 Press clippings
 Article
 Interview
 Legends of Television
Bill Boggs on Breaking it Down with Frank MacKay

1941 births
Living people
Television personalities from Philadelphia
American game show hosts
American television news anchors
Annenberg School for Communication at the University of Pennsylvania alumni
American television talk show hosts